USS Douglas L. Howard (DE-138) was an  in service with the United States Navy from 1943 to 1946. She was scrapped in 1974.

History
USS Douglas L. Howard was named in honor of Douglas Legate Howard. She was launched 24 January 1943 by Consolidated Steel Corp., Ltd., Orange, Texas; sponsored by Mrs. D. I. Thomas, daughter of Douglas Legate Howard; and commissioned 29 July 1943.

Battle of the Atlantic
Between 4 October 1943 and 19 March 1944 Douglas L. Howard escorted three convoys to Casablanca, French Morocco. After repairs at Boston, Massachusetts, she joined  for antisubmarine patrol in the South Atlantic from 8 September to 26 November.
 
Douglas L. Howard continued to screen Mission Bay during training in the Caribbean and the qualification of aviators in carrier operations off Mayport, Florida, then returned to ASW operations in the North Atlantic.

Pacific War
Douglas L. Howard left Boston 30 June 1945 for San Diego, California, and reached Pearl Harbor 8 August. On 3 September she reported to Eniwetok for patrol and local escort duty, and from 25 September to 16 November she assisted in the occupation of Lele Island in the Carolines and the disposition of its surrendered military equipment. She served on occupation duty in the Marshalls until 6 January 1946 when she left Kwajalein for the United States. She called at San Diego, California, then continued to New York, arriving 15 February.

Decommissioning and fate
On 13 March she arrived at Green Cove Springs, Florida, where she was placed out of commission in reserve 17 June 1946. She was struck from the Navy List on 1 October 1972 and was sold 14 May 1974 and scrapped.

References

External links

 

World War II frigates and destroyer escorts of the United States
Edsall-class destroyer escorts
Ships built in Orange, Texas
1943 ships